James William Cartwright (born July 30, 1957) is an American former professional basketball player and a former head coach of the Chicago Bulls of the National Basketball Association (NBA). A 7'1" (2.16 m) center, he played 16 seasons for the New York Knicks, Chicago Bulls and Seattle SuperSonics, helping the Bulls capture consecutive championships in the 1991, 1992 and 1993 seasons. He attended Elk Grove High School in Elk Grove, California, and played college basketball at the University of San Francisco.

High school and college career
In high school, Cartwright played basketball for the Elk Grove Thundering Herd under coach Dan Risley.

In 1974 and 1975, he was named California High School State Basketball Player of the Year.  In 1975, he was named California High School Sports Athlete of the Year.

On March 6–8, 1975, Cartwright's Elk Grove High School team won the 29th Annual Tournament Of Champions in Oakland (predecessor of the California Interscholastic Federation State Basketball Championship).

As a prep star, Cartwright was just as highly regarded as fellow preps Darryl Dawkins and Bill Willoughby.

Cartwright played college ball at the University of San Francisco and was a consensus second-team all-American in 1977 and 1979.  During his time at USF, Cartwright played on one of the tallest starting lineups in collegiate history.  He graduated as the all-time leading scorer for the Dons, averaging 19.1 points and 10.2 rebounds per game. Cartwright led San Francisco to three trips to the NCAA tournament, to the first round in the 1977 and to the Sweet Sixteen in both 1978 and 1979.

Professional career

New York Knicks (1979–1988)
Cartwright was the third overall pick in the 1979 NBA draft selected by the New York Knicks, making his only career All-Star Game appearance in his first season. He averaged more than 20 points per game in his first two seasons for the Knicks, but after playing no fewer than 77 games in his first five seasons, a series of foot injuries caused him to miss the entire 1984–1985 season. Following that season, the Knicks drafted center Patrick Ewing with the number-one overall pick in the 1985 NBA Draft. However, ongoing foot problems limited Cartwright to only two appearances during the 1985–1986 season. When Cartwright returned for the 1986–1987 season, he and Ewing would often start and play together but during the 1987–1988 season Cartwright was relegated to the bench.

Chicago Bulls (1988–1994)

On June 15, 1988, Cartwright was traded to the Chicago Bulls for forward Charles Oakley. The Bulls were willing to part with Oakley, the league's second-leading rebounder in the 1986–87 and 1987–88 seasons, because of their need for a center and the rapid development of power forward Horace Grant. Cartwright was the Bulls' starting center during their string of three consecutive NBA championships in 1991, 1992 and 1993. During the 1992–93 season, Cartwright took an elbow to the throat during a regular-season game against the Indiana Pacers that fractured his larynx and left him with a hoarse voice.

The Bulls, who were without Michael Jordan the following season following his retirement, made the 1994 NBA playoffs but were eliminated in a controversial game 7 in the Eastern Conference semifinals by the Knicks. Cartwright departed the team thereafter as an unrestricted free agent.

Seattle SuperSonics (1994–1995)
Cartwright left the Bulls as a free agent and signed with the Seattle SuperSonics. He only played in 29 games for the Sonics, and retired after the 1994–95 NBA season.

Coaching career
A year after his retirement, Cartwright joined the Bulls once again as an assistant coach under Phil Jackson ahead of the 1996–97 NBA season. He was a member of the championship-winning teams in 1997 and 1998. The Bulls went through significant changes following the 1997–98 season, with not only Jordan and Pippen leaving, but Tim Floyd taking over as head coach from Jackson. The Bulls had a lengthy rebuilding effort, and Cartwright took over the Bulls 27 games into the 2001–02 season, going 17–38 after the team's 4–23 start under Floyd and interim head coach Bill Berry, the latter whom coached for two games before Cartwright was named interim head coach. The Bulls finished 21–61 on the year and the following season Cartwright was promoted from interim to permanent head coach. In the 2002–03 season the Bulls finished 30–52, but Cartwright would last only 14 games into the 2003–04 season — going 4–10 — before being fired. Pete Myers and finally Scott Skiles coached the Bulls immediately following Cartwright's tenure.

In 2004, the New Jersey Nets hired Cartwright as an assistant coach under Lawrence Frank. In 2008, Cartwright was named as an assistant coach for the Phoenix Suns under Terry Porter. Suns general manager Steve Kerr hired the former big man to help coach veteran big man Shaquille O'Neal, all-star Amar'e Stoudemire, and upcoming draft picks. After the Suns dismissed Porter and promoted assistant Alvin Gentry, Cartwright stayed on as assistant coach with the team.

In January 2013, Cartwright was hired to coach Osaka Evessa in Japan.

In September 2014, Cartwright was hired as the head coach of the Mexico National Basketball Team.

Personal life
Cartwright married his junior high school sweetheart, Sheri, and together they have four children Justin, Jason, James and Kristin and has 2 grandkids names Trey and Gavin. He earned a bachelor's degree in sociology from USF and later obtained a master's degree in organization development in 1998 from the same institution. In 2016, Cartwright became USF’s director of university initiatives.

Cartwright is an avid fan of doo-wop music from the 1950s and 1960s, and plays guitar and collects transistor radios as hobbies.

NBA career statistics

Regular season

|-
| style="text-align:left;"| 
| style="text-align:left;"|New York
| 82 ||  || 38.4 || .547 || – || .797 || 8.9 || 2.0 || 0.6 || 1.2 || 21.7
|-
| style="text-align:left;"| 
| style="text-align:left;"|New York
| 82 ||  || 35.7 || .554 || .000 || .788 || 7.5 || 1.4 || 0.6 || 1.0 || 20.1
|-
| style="text-align:left;"| 
| style="text-align:left;"|New York
| 72 || 50 || 28.6 || .562 || – || .763 || 5.8 || 1.2 || 0.7 || 0.9 || 14.4
|-
| style="text-align:left;"| 
| style="text-align:left;"|New York
| 82 || 82 || 30.1 || .566 || – || .744 || 7.2 || 1.7 || 0.5 || 1.5 || 15.7
|-
| style="text-align:left;"| 
| style="text-align:left;"|New York
| 77 || 77 || 32.3 || .561 || .000 || .805 || 8.4 || 1.4 || 0.6 || 1.3 || 17.0
|-
| style="text-align:left;"| 
| style="text-align:left;"|New York
| 2 || 0 || 18.0 || .429 || – || .600 || 5.0 || 2.5 || 0.5 || 0.5 || 6.0
|-
| style="text-align:left;"| 
| style="text-align:left;"|New York
| 58 || 50 || 34.3 || .531 || – || .790 || 7.7 || 1.7 || 0.7 || 0.4 || 17.5
|-
| style="text-align:left;"| 
| style="text-align:left;"|New York
| 82 || 4 || 20.4 || .544 || – || .798 || 4.7 || 1.0 || 0.5 || 0.5 || 11.1
|-
| style="text-align:left;"| 
| style="text-align:left;"|Chicago
| 78 || 76 || 29.9 || .475 || – || .766 || 6.7 || 1.2 || 0.3 || 0.5 || 12.4
|-
| style="text-align:left;"| 
| style="text-align:left;"|Chicago
| 71 || 71 || 30.4 || .488 || – || .811 || 6.5 || 2.0 || 0.5 || 0.5 || 11.4
|-
| style="text-align:left;background:#afe6ba;"|†
| style="text-align:left;"|Chicago
| 79 || 79 || 28.8 || .490 || – || .697 || 6.2 || 1.6 || 0.4 || 0.2 || 9.6
|-
| style="text-align:left;background:#afe6ba;"|†
| style="text-align:left;"|Chicago
| 64 || 64 || 23.0 || .467 || – || .604 || 5.1 || 1.4 || 0.3 || 0.2 || 8.0
|-
| style="text-align:left;background:#afe6ba;"|†
| style="text-align:left;"|Chicago
| 63 || 63 || 19.9 || .411 || – || .735 || 3.7 || 1.3 || 0.3 || 0.2 || 5.6
|-
| style="text-align:left;"| 
| style="text-align:left;"|Chicago
| 42 || 41 || 18.6 || .513 || – || .684 || 3.6 || 1.4 || 0.2 || 0.2 || 5.6
|-
| style="text-align:left;"| 
| style="text-align:left;"|Seattle
| 29 || 19 || 14.8 || .391 || – || .625 || 3.0 || 0.3 || 0.2 || 0.1 || 2.4
|- class="sortbottom"
| style="text-align:center;" colspan="2"| Career
| 963 || 676 || 28.5 || .525 || .000 || .771 || 6.3 || 1.4 || 0.5 || 0.7 || 13.2
|- class="sortbottom"
| style="text-align:center;" colspan="2"| All-Star
| 1 || 0 || 14.0 || .500 || – || – || 3.0 || 1.0 || 0.0 || 0.0 || 8.0

Playoffs

|-
|style="text-align:left;"|1981
|style="text-align:left;"|New York
|2||||24.5||.353||–||.667||6.5||0.5||0.5||0.5||10.0
|-
|style="text-align:left;"|1983
|style="text-align:left;"|New York
|6||||28.7||.581||–||.773||5.7||0.7||0.5||1.2||11.2
|-
|style="text-align:left;"|1984
|style="text-align:left;"|New York
|12||||33.2||.556||–||.863||8.3||0.4||0.2||1.2||17.4
|-
|style="text-align:left;"|1988
|style="text-align:left;"|New York
|4||0||19.0||.500||–||.733||4.8||1.5||0.0||0.8||7.3
|-
|style="text-align:left;"|1989
|style="text-align:left;"|Chicago
|17||17||34.3||.486||–||.700||7.1||1.2||0.5||0.7||11.8
|-
|style="text-align:left;"|1990
|style="text-align:left;"|Chicago
|16||16||28.9||.413||–||.674||4.7||1.0||0.3||0.3||8.1
|-
| style="text-align:left;background:#afe6ba;"|1991†
|style="text-align:left;"|Chicago
|17||17||30.1||.519||–||.688||4.7||1.9||0.5||0.4||9.5
|-
| style="text-align:left;background:#afe6ba;"|1992†
|style="text-align:left;"|Chicago
|22||22||37.8||.474||–||.419||4.5||1.7||0.5||0.2||5.6
|-
| style="text-align:left;background:#afe6ba;"|1993†
|style="text-align:left;"|Chicago
|19||19||23.4||.465||–||.778||4.5||1.5||0.6||0.2||6.3
|-
|style="text-align:left;"|1994
|style="text-align:left;"|Chicago
|9||8||21.0||.326||–||.813||4.9||1.2||0.3||0.2||4.6
|- class="sortbottom"
| style="text-align:center;" colspan="2"| Career
| 124 || 99 || 28.2 || .482 || – || .725 || 5.4 || 1.3 || 0.4 || 0.5 || 8.9

Head coaching record

NBA

|-
| style="text-align:left;"|Chicago
| style="text-align:left;"|
| 55||17||38|||| style="text-align:center;"|8th in Central|||—||—||—||—
| style="text-align:center;"|Missed playoffs
|-
| style="text-align:left;"|Chicago
| style="text-align:left;"|
| 82||30||52|||| style="text-align:center;"|6th in Central|||—||—||—||—
| style="text-align:center;"|Missed playoffs
|-
| style="text-align:left;"|Chicago
| style="text-align:left;"|
| 14||4||10|||| style="text-align:center;"|(fired)|||—||—||—||—
| style="text-align:center;"|—
|- class="sortbottom"
| style="text-align:center;" colspan="2"|Career
| 151||51||100|||| ||—||—||—||—||

Japan

|- 
| style="text-align:left;"|Osaka Evessa
| style="text-align:left;"|2013
| 21||15||6|||| style="text-align:center;"|7th in Western|||—||—||—||—
| style="text-align:center;"|Missed playoffs

See also
 List of NCAA Division I men's basketball players with 2000 points and 1000 rebounds

References

External links
 
 Official NBA bio
 Career statistics

1957 births
Living people
20th-century African-American sportspeople
21st-century African-American people
African-American basketball players
African-American basketball coaches
All-American college men's basketball players
American expatriate basketball people in Japan
American men's basketball players
Basketball coaches from California
Basketball players from California
Centers (basketball)
Chicago Bulls assistant coaches
Chicago Bulls head coaches
Chicago Bulls players
National Basketball Association All-Stars
New Jersey Nets assistant coaches
New York Knicks draft picks
New York Knicks players
Osaka Evessa coaches
Parade High School All-Americans (boys' basketball)
People from Lodi, California
Phoenix Suns assistant coaches
San Francisco Dons men's basketball players
Seattle SuperSonics players
Sportspeople from Elk Grove, California